Sellye is a town in Baranya county, Hungary. It is the centre of the Ormánság, a region located in the southern part of Baranya county.

History
According to László Szita the settlement was completely Hungarian in the 18th century.

Twin towns — sister cities
Sellye is twinned with:
  Gnas, Austria
  Grubišno Polje, Croatia

References

External links

  in Hungarian

Populated places in Baranya County